Thoreauia is a genus of wasps belonging to the family Trichogrammatidae.

Species:

Thoreauia compressiventris 
Thoreauia gargantua 
Thoreauia gemma

References

Trichogrammatidae
Hymenoptera genera